Original Boardwalk Style is a live album from Trey Anastasio and the Undectet, released on June 10, 2008 on Anastasio’s own Rubber Jungle Records. It was recorded live on December 30 and 31, 2006, at the House of Blues in Atlantic City, New Jersey. These two shows were recorded shortly after Anastasio was arrested for drug possession earlier that month and were his final concerts before he began a drug rehabilitation program; Anastasio made a reference to the arrest during the song "Makisupa Policeman" during the December 31 show, but that song does not appear on the album.

Proceeds from the sale of the album benefit the Seven Below Arts Initiative, established by Anastasio in 2006 to foster artistic development and support arts education in the state of Vermont.

Track listing 

 "Drifting" (Anastasio, Lawton, Markellis) - 7:11
 "Plasma" (Anastasio, Herman, Marshall) - 11:51
 "Shine" (Anastasio, O'Brien) - 6:55
 "Alive Again" (Anastasio, Herman, Marshall) - 8:06
 "Mud City" (Anastasio) - 7:42
 "Simple Twist Up Dave" (Anastasio, Herman, Marshall) - 8:13
 "Tuesday" (Anastasio) - 5:33
 "Money, Love and Change" (Anastasio, Marshall) - 14:00
 "Mr. Completely" (Anastasio) - 8:43
 "First Tube" (Anastasio, Lawton, Markellis) - 8:41

Track 10 is only available when the album is purchased from Live Phish.com.

Personnel 

 Trey Anastasio - guitar, vocals
 Peter Apfelbaum - saxophone, flute 
 Cyro Baptista - percussion
 Jeff Cressman - trombone
 Christina Durfee - vocals, synthesizer
 Dave Grippo - saxophone
 Tony Hall - bass, vocals
 Jennifer Hartswick - vocals, trumpet
 Ray Paczkowski - keyboards
 Russell Remington - saxophone, flute
 Jeff Sipe - drums

References

Trey Anastasio albums
2008 live albums